The 1976 Louisville Open, also known as the Louisville International Tennis Classic, was a men's tennis tournament played on outdoor clay courts at the Louisville Tennis Center in Louisville, Kentucky, USA. It was the seventh edition of the tournament and was held from 26 July through 2 August 1976. The tournament was part of the Grand Prix tennis circuit and categorized as Four Star. The singles final was won by Harold Solomon who received $20,000 first prize money.

Finals

Singles
 Harold Solomon defeated  Wojciech Fibak 6–2, 7–5
 It was Solomon's 3rd singles title of the year and the 8th of his career.

Doubles
 Byron Bertram /  Pat Cramer defeated  Stan Smith /  Erik van Dillen 6–3, 6–4

References

External links
ITF tournament details

Louisville Open
Louisville Open
Louisville Open
1976 in American tennis